Malwina J. Luczak is a mathematician specializing in probability theory and the theory of random graphs. She is Professor of Applied Probability and ARC Future Fellow in the University of Melbourne.

Education and research
Luczak grew up in Poland, and began her university studies at age 16 at the Nicolaus Copernicus University in Toruń, studying the philology of the English language. However, after a second year studying philology at Keele University in the UK, she decided to switch to mathematics, and enrolled at St Catherine's College, Oxford. After her first year's examinations, she was able to obtain scholarship support and continue her studies and remain at Oxford for doctoral work. She completed her D.Phil. in 2001 with a dissertation, Probability, algorithms and telecommunication systems, supervised by Colin McDiarmid and Dominic Welsh.

She became an assistant lecturer at the Statistical Laboratory at the University of Cambridge and then a reader in mathematics at the London School of Economics. However, in 2010, failing to receive an expected promotion to professor, she took instead a professorial chair at the University of Sheffield and a five-year Engineering and Physical Sciences Research Council Leadership Fellowship. She moved again to Queen Mary University of London before taking her present position in Melbourne in 2017.

Research
Luczak's publications include research on the supermarket model in queueing theory,
cores of random graphs, the giant component in random graphs with specified degree distributions, and the Glauber dynamics of the Ising model.

They include:

References

External links
Home page

Year of birth missing (living people)
Living people
Polish mathematicians
Australian mathematicians
Women mathematicians
Probability theorists
Graph theorists
Alumni of St Catherine's College, Oxford
Academics of the University of Cambridge
Academics of the London School of Economics
Academics of the University of Sheffield
Academics of Queen Mary University of London
Academic staff of the University of Melbourne